Pollok Football Club is a Scottish football club based in Newlands in the southside of the city of Glasgow. The club competes in the West of Scotland Football League and are one of the biggest football clubs operating in Scottish non-league football, regularly attracting crowds of around 700. Pollok play at Newlandsfield Park  and wear black and white stripes. Their traditional rivals are Arthurlie of Barrhead.

History

Early Years (1908 - 1967)
Formed in 1908 as an offshoot of Poloc Cricket Club and based at a ground called Haggs Park within Pollok Estate until 1926. In the first half century of their existence, Pollok were one of many average clubs in Junior football in Glasgow, with their success limited to minor cups such as the North Eastern Cup, Kirkwood Shield and Glasgow Consolation Cup. The club moved to their current home at Newlandsfield Park in 1928, but major success remained elusive.

Pollok began to make their mark in major tournaments during the Second World War, lifting a Central League Cup and Glasgow Challenge Cup double in 1942. Their standout season in those early years was 1944-45, as they reached the Scottish Junior Cup semi-final, where they fell to Burnbank Athletic at Shawfield in front of 25,000 fans. The previous round saw a record crowd of over 10,000 pack into Newlandsfield to watch the Lok overcome Fauldhouse United. This season also saw Pollok lift their first ever West of Scotland Junior Cup after a 6-1 replay win against Glasgow Perthsire.

Rise to prominence (1967 - 2002)
The club eventually rose to prominence upon the demise of Third Lanark in 1967 with many supporters opting to support Pollok, being in close proximity on the south side of Glasgow. Pollok finally lifted a top-flight league title as they topped the Central League in 1978–79. They retained their title in 1981, alongside their first major honour, the Scottish Junior Cup, with Norrie Fulton scoring the only goal of the game at Hampden Park in front of 13,518 supporters.

Pollok lifted the Junior Cup again in 1985, when they defeated Petershill after a replay in the final. This season also saw them win the second of three Central Premier Division titles in a row to make the 1980s the club's most successful decade in their history. Their hopes of winning back to back Junior Cups were dashed in 1986 however, as they fell to a 3-2 defeat against Auchinleck Talbot in the tournament's centenary year.

The club's success continued into the 1990s, a decade which brought eleven trophies, including three league titles. The pinncacle though was a third Junior Cup success in 1997, as Pollok beat Tayport 3-1 at Fir Park. For the second time however, they were denied back to back cup wins, this time by rivals Arthurlie who triumphed 4-0 in the 1998 final. Manager Jim O'Donnell left, along with much of the squad, being replaced by former player Andy Dailly, who only lasted 37 matches before being replaced himself by long-serving goalkeeper Ronnie Lowrie.

SJFA West Region (2002 - 2021)
Junior football in the west of Scotland was restructured in 2002, amalgamating the Central and Ayrshire leagues to form the West Region. Prior to this Pollok had been champions of the Central league eight times. The top league of the new set up was the West Premier League which Pollok became the inaugural champions of in 2003 under Ronnie Lowrie, before further triumphs in 2005 and 2007 under Rab Sneddon.

Beginning in the 2007–08 season the SFA began inviting the winners of the four major Junior honours (Scottish Junior Cup, West Premier League, East Super League, & North Premier League) to take part in the Senior Scottish Cup. Pollok were reigning champions of the West Premier League at the time, and took part in the 2007–08 Scottish Cup. In the 1st round 'Lok were drawn away against St Cuthbert Wanderers of the South of Scotland League. The match took place at St. Mary's Park, Kirkcudbright with Pollok winning comfortably by 6 goals to 2. Montrose of the Third Division were to be Pollok's opponents in the second round. Pollok performed admirably against the Scottish League club, achieving a 2–2 draw at Links Park. In the replay at Newlandsfield 'Lok were not as successful and lost 1–0.

The end of that campaign again saw Pollok crowned West Premier League Champions, after a long run of rearranged games at the end of the campaign culminated with a 5-4 win against Glenafton to secure the crown. At the start of the following season they were eliminated in the first round of the 2008–09 Scottish Cup by Edinburgh-based East of Scotland team Spartans. At the end of the season Pollok had a chance to once again retain their West Premier League championship but lost the last league game of the season away to Auchinleck Talbot by failing to defend a 1–0 lead in the last eight minutes. Having exited the Scottish Junior Cup at the semi-final stage for the second year in a row, manager Jim Sinnett promptly resigned after the game.

2009–10 did not go well for Pollok with an early exit in the Scottish Junior Cup away to Newtongrange Star. In March 2010 manager Rab Sneddon resigned for work reasons and was succeeded by Willie Irvine.

Season 2010–11 saw Pollok suffer a shock exit at home to Neilston Juniors in the Scottish Junior Cup. Season 2011–12 saw Pollok lose four of their opening seven league fixtures, prompting Willie Irvine to tender his resignation on Monday, 10 October 2011. His eventual replacement was John Richardson, who kept the club in the top flight after a relegation play-off against Renfrew. Season 2012–13 saw Pollok win both the Central Sectional League Cup and the Central League Cup as well as narrowly avoiding relegation for the second year running. Only three players were retained from the previous season for 2013–14. This season was a disaster for Pollok. The club was embroiled in many off field controversies and had four different managers throughout the season.

Tony McInally, was appointed as manager in December 2013 but Pollok were finally relegated on 28 April 2014 with a 3–2 loss to Glenafton Athletic. Under McInally, Pollok were promoted as Champions the following season and won the Evening Times Champions Cup. The club reached the final of the 2015–16 Scottish Junior Cup but lost to Beith Juniors on penalty kicks after a 1–1 draw.

In 2016, the club briefly received widespread media attention after right-back Tam Hanlon scored a hat-trick of long-range goals (two free kicks and one from open play) in a match against Neilston. The feat was captured on video and quickly went viral, being viewed millions of times and leading international players and pundits to praise the quality of the goals.

Pollok won the 2017 West of Scotland Junior Cup, with a 5-4 victory on penalties against Cumnock Juniors after the match in front of over 1000 spectators at Newlandsfield had ended with the scores level at 2-2.

Pollok lifted the Central League Cup in June 2018, after a 3-1 win against Cumbernauld United in Shettleston before Tony McInally departed Newlandsfield in October 2018. and was replaced shortly after by Murdie MacKinnon, who had previously served as assistant manager.

In March 2020, Pollok played their final match as a junior club when they defeated Dalry Thistle 2-1 in the West of Scotland Cup. The next round was due to be played the following week against Irvine Meadow, but that tie was postponed before all remaining league and cup matches were cancelled by the SJFA due to the COVID-19 pandemic. Pollok eventually finished third in their final West Region Premiership campaign after the title was awarded to Auchinleck Talbot on a points-per-game basis. The 2019-20 Scottish Junior Cup was eventually declared null and void in March 2021 with Pollok having reached the semi-final.

West of Scotland Football League & SFA Membership (2021 - )
In 2020, Pollok moved from the SJFA, to join the pyramid system in Scottish football as one of the inaugural members of the West of Scotland Football League.

On 11 October 2020, the club announced they would not be participating in the inaugural season of the West of Scotland League due to concerns relating to the COVID-19 pandemic, citing safety of volunteers and players, and the financial impact on the club of pursuing a campaign with no matchday income, as the main reasons.

In July 2021, Pollok played their first competitive match as a senior side when they began their inaugural West of Scotland Football League Premier Division season with a 5-1 win at home to Blantyre Victoria in front of a crowd of 500, as full stadiums were not yet permitted under COVID-19 restrictions. Pollok's first goal at this level was scored by Adam Forde. As members of the West of Scotland Football League, Pollok also made their debut in the South Challenge Cup in October 2021, beating Vale of Clyde in a 4-0 win at Fullarton Park in Glasgow's East End. After a 38-game season, Pollok finished their maiden campaign in third place. The club were accepted as members of the Scottish FA on the 25th May 2022, allowing them to enter the Scottish Cup the following season. On the 19th June, Pollok confirmed via their website that they would not renew their SJFA membership.

In August 2022, Pollok returned to the Scottish Cup for the first time since 2008 with a 6-0 win at home to Girvan in the 2022 - 23 Preliminary Round. They then repeated this scoreline in the following round at home to Highland League side Huntly. They followed this up with a 4-3 win at home to Annan Athletic in the second round in front of the BBC Scotland cameras. This represented the club's first ever victory against SPFL opposition. Manager Murdo MacKinnon resigned from his post after four years in November 2022 following a West of Scotland Cup defeat at home to Division 1 side St Cadoc's, and was replaced by former Kirkintilloch Rob Roy manager Stewart Maxwell. His first game was the Scottish Cup Round 3 match against Ayr United at Somerset Park, as Pollok fell to a narrow 1-0 defeat against the Championship leaders.

Scottish Cup participation

Following a restructuring of the Scottish Cup in 2007, four Scottish Junior FA clubs were admitted into the competition and Pollok took their place in the competition for the first time as champions of the SJFA West Premier League. Their first match in the competition was a thumping 6-2 win against South of Scotland side St Cuthbert Wanderers in Kirkcudbright.

The second round draw saw Pollok travel to Links Park, to face Scottish Football League opposition in competitive action for the first time in the form of Montrose. Despite taking an early lead through Robert Downes, the Lok required a late equaliser from David Turnbull to force a replay. Nearly 2000 supporters packed into Newlandsfield for the historic occasion, as the home side were narrowly edged out 1-0 in their maiden Scottish Cup campaign.

After retaining their title, Pollok again took their place in the competition in 2008, although this campaign was not as memorable. A 1-1 home draw with Spartans was followed by a 1-0 defeat in the replay, as Pollok dropped out of the competition for the next fourteen years.

Pollok narrowly lost their league crown on the last day of the 2008-09 season, and failed to win an SJFA title again before joining the West of Scotland Football League in 2020. This kicked off Pollok's journey to achieve SFA member status, which was granted in May 2022, allowing the club entry into the following season's Scottish Cup.

Girvan were the visitors in August 2022 as Newlandsfield hosted Scottish Cup football for the first time in fourteen years under the management of Murdo MacKinnon, and it was an emphatic return for the Lok, who won the preliminary round tie 6-0. This result was repeated in the First Round at home to Highland League side Huntly, in a match that was intended for live television coverage, which was cancelled due to a demand on resources following the death of the Queen. The second round saw Annan Athletic of SPFL League 2 come to Newlandsfield. On one of the greatest nights in the club's history, Pollok triumphed 4-3 in front of the BBC Scotland cameras in a classic tie which represented their first ever competitive victory against SPFL opposition.

The reward for that win was a trip to Somerset Park to face Championship leaders Ayr United, the highest ranked team Pollok had ever faced in competitive action. Despite a strong defensive performance, the home side won 1-0 in front of 2425 supporters, with 726 Pollok fans among the largest crowd of the third round.

Crest and colours
Pollok's badge is a simple shield containing a black and white saltire, a football and a tree, which is a nod to the coat of arms of Glasgow.

Since their formation, Pollok have played in black and white as a tribute to their first honorary President Sir John Stirling-Maxwell, who gifted the club land within the Pollok estate for use as their home park. The colours were taken from the heraldic shield of Pollok House.

Stadium

Pollok play their home games at Newlandsfield Park in the Newlands area of Glasgow, a ground they have used since the 1928–29 season. The stadium has a capacity of 874, and is entirely made up of terracing.

Pollok's first ground was at Haggs Park in the Pollok Estate, but they were forced to move out in 1926–27 as Glasgow City Council wanted the land for school pitches. After playing temporarily at Rosebery Park and the Queen Mary Tea Gardens at Speirsbridge (in Thornliebank), they acquired Newlandsfield Park, which has been their ground ever since.

In January 2022, the club received planning permission to install floodlights at Newlandsfield. These were installed and switched on for the first time in April 2022. The first match played under the lights was a 1-0 victory against Clydebank in the WoSFL Cup quarter final in May 2022.

Current squad

Loans

Coaching staff 

As of 6 January 2023

Honours

Scottish Junior Cup
Winners: 1980–81, 1984–85, 1996–97
Runners-up: 1985–86, 1997–98, 2015–16

SJFA West Premier League
Winners: 2002–03, 2004–05, 2006–07, 2007–08

Central League Premier Division
Winners: 1984–85, 1985–86, 1986–87, 1990–91, 1994–95, 1995–96

Central League 
Winners: 1978–79, 1980–81

Central League A Division
Winners: 1980–81

Central League B Division 
Winners: 1968–69, 1978–79

SJFA West Super First Division
Winners: 2014–15

West of Scotland Junior Cup
Winners: 1944–45, 1986–87, 1991–92, 1997–98, 1999–2000, 2016–17
Runners-up: 1985-86, 1994–95, 2007–08, 2010-11Evening Times Cup Winners Cup'''
Winners: 1979–80, 1980–81, 1983–84, 1984–85, 1985–86, 1987–88, 2003–04, 2006–07, 2007–08, 2014–15

Other honours
 
SJFA Supercup: 2003–04, 2005–06
Glasgow Junior Cup: 1941–42, 1953–54, 1961–62
Glasgow Dryburgh Cup: 1930–31, 1941–42, 1948–49
Central League Cup: 1977–78, 1979–80, 1983–84, 1987–88, 1989–90, 2004–05, 2008–09, 2010–11, 2012–13, 2015–16, 2017–18
Central Sectional League Cup: 1983–84, 1987–88, 1990–91, 1992–93, 1996–97, 1999–2000, 2003–04, 2006–07, 2012–13

Notable former players
On settling the Intermediate dispute in 1931 Pollok sold the following players to senior football: J.McBride, J.Robertson and R.Griffiths to Chelsea; Charlie M. Thomson to Sunderland and T.Armstrong to Airdrieonians. Other Pollok players who have also played in the Scottish Football League or Football League include Brian Bilsland, Kevin Budinauckas, Ross O'Donoghue, Craig Cranmer and Danny Diver. Former Pollok striker Dougie Arnott achieved Scottish Cup success with Motherwell. Players who have moved up to senior level from Pollok include John Sweeney – former Clyde captain, Arbroath keeper Scott Morrison, Airdrieonians assistant/player Paul Lovering and Albion Rovers defender Ross Dunlop.

More recently, Hartlepool United midfielder Mouhamed Niang made 30 competitive appearances for Pollok from 2017–2018 having made the step up from the Pollok United Soccer Academy. Winger Matty Grant also spent a year with the club before moving to League 2 Stranraer in 2022.

Managers (1984–present)

 Dick Brock (April 1984 – 1989-90)
 Tommy Reynolds (1989-90 – 1992-93)
 Jim George (1992-93 – 1994-95)
 Jim O’Donnell (1995-96 – June 1998)
 Andy Dailly (June 1998 – Mar 1999)
 Ronnie Lowrie (Mar 1999 – Apr 2004)
 Kevin O’Neil / Frannie McNeill (caretaker management): (April 2004 – June 2004)
 Rab Sneddon (June 2004 – June 2008)
 Jim Sinnet (June 2008 – April 2009)
 Harry Erwin / Mark McWilliams (caretaker management): (April 2009 – June 2009)
 Rab Sneddon (May 2009* – Feb 2010) (*took control for season 2009-10)
 Willie Irvine (March 2010 – October 2011)
 John Richardson (November 2011 -September 2013)
 Stephen Docherty (October 2013 – December 2013)
 Tony McInally (December 2013 – October 2018)
 Murdo MacKinnon (October 2018 – November 2022)
 Stewart Maxwell (November 2022 – Present)

References

External links
Official website

Association football clubs established in 1908
Football clubs in Scotland
Football clubs in Glasgow
1908 establishments in Scotland
Pollokshaws
West of Scotland Football League teams